Alterlaa  is a station on  of the Vienna U-Bahn. It is located in the Liesing District. It opened on 15 April 1995 as part of the section between Philadelphiabrücke and Siebenhirten.

References

External links 
 

Buildings and structures in Liesing
Railway stations opened in 1995
Vienna U-Bahn stations